Osterrönfeld was an Amt ("collective municipality") in the Rendsburg-Eckernförde, in Schleswig-Holstein, Germany. Its seat was in Osterrönfeld. In January 2008, it was merged with the independent municipality of Schacht-Audorf to form the Amt Eiderkanal.

The Amt Nusse consisted of the following municipalities (population in 2005 between brackets):

Bovenau
Haßmoor 
Ostenfeld
Osterrönfeld 
Rade bei Rendsburg 
Schülldorf

References

Former Ämter in Schleswig-Holstein